Calder Publications is a publisher of books.  Since 1949, the company has published many books on all the arts, particularly subjects such as opera and painting, the theatre and critical and philosophical theory.  Calder's authors have achieved nineteen Nobel Literature Prizes and three for Peace.

History 

John Calder started his publishing house in 1949 when manuscripts were plentiful and many books that were in demand were out of print – in the immediate post-war years paper was scarce and severely rationed.

During the 1950s he built up a list of translated classics, which included the works of Chekhov, Tolstoy, Dostoevsky, Goethe and Zola among others. Calder then began to publish American titles. As a result of Senator Joe McCarthy's "witch-hunt" he was able to acquire significant American authors as well as books on issues of civil liberty that mainstream publishers in New York City were afraid to keep on their lists. This led to the development of close ties with those smaller American firms who resisted the McCarthyite pressure.

By the late 1950s, Calder was publishing a group of new writers who would change the face of twentieth-century literature. One of these was Samuel Beckett, all of whose novels, poetry, criticism, and some of his plays were published by Calder.  Several writers on the Calder list became synonymous with the school of the "nouveau roman" or "new novel", including Alain Robbe-Grillet, Marguerite Duras, Claude Simon, Nathalie Sarraute and Robert Pinget. Other European novelists, playwrights and poets included Heinrich Böll, Dino Buzzati, Eugène Ionesco, Fernando Arrabal, René de Obaldia, Peter Weiss and Ivo Andric. Calder was soon launching new experimental British writers such as Ann Quin, Alan Burns, Eva Tucker and R. C. Kennedy – who, influenced by their European counterparts, became part of the avant-garde of the early 1960s.

From his experience of authors' tours, John Calder saw that readers much enjoyed hearing authors air their ideas in public – often in heated debate. He persuaded the Edinburgh Festival to stage large literary conferences – the first of their kind – which in 1962 and 1963 were immensely successful. They attracted many of the world's leading writers, as well as others whose names were not yet familiar to the public.

Controversy 

Following their visit to Scotland, Calder began to publish the previously banned work of writers Henry Miller and William S. Burroughs. Controversy also surrounded the publication of Alexander Trocchi's Cain's Book, which was a success despite a minor obscenity trial in Sheffield. Hubert Selby's Last Exit to Brooklyn, although well reviewed, had a more serious case brought against it, first in a private prosecution by Tory MP Cyril Black, and then at the Old Bailey. John Mortimer led a successful appeal and the company was vindicated after losing in both lower courts.

Ownership

In 1963 the company changed its name to Calder and Boyars to accommodate a new partner (Marion Boyars, who subsequently founded Marion Boyars Publishers), but the company went back to its original name when the partnership was dissolved in 1975.

In 2007, Calder Publications was acquired by Oneworld Classics, a joint venture between Alma Books and Oneworld Publications. In 2012, Alma Books acquired full ownership of Calder and Oneworld Classics, renaming the latter Alma Classics.

Book series
 Calderbooks
 English National Opera Guides
 European Classics (also known as: Translations of European Classics)
 German Expressionism
 German Writing in Translation
 Illustrated Calderbooks
 Jupiter Books
 New Writers
 Opera Library
 Profile Books
 Signature

References

External links
Calder Publications - archived version of website as it was on 23 May 2002.
Alma Classics
 Calder & Boyars mss., 1939-1980

Book publishing companies of the United Kingdom
Opera publishing companies
Music publishing companies of the United Kingdom
Publishing companies established in 1949